Raúl Martínez (born January 21, 1982 in San Antonio, Texas) is an American former professional boxer who competed from 2004 to 2014. He challenged for the IBF flyweight title in 2009 and the IBF super-flyweight title in 2011.

Professional career
Martínez fought Rodrigo Guerrero for the vacant IBF super flyweight title on 8 October 2011.

References

External links

Living people
1982 births
American male boxers
Flyweight boxers
Super-flyweight boxers
Boxers from Texas
Sportspeople from San Antonio
American boxers of Mexican descent